The following is a list of notable events and releases of the year 2010 in Norwegian music.

Events

January
 29
 Nordlysfestivalen started in Tromsø (January 29 – February 6).
 Bodvar Moe (bass) was awarded the Nordlysprisen 2010 at Nordlysfestivalen.

February
 3 – The Polarjazz Festival 2010 started in Longyearbyen (February 3–7).
 4 – Kristiansund Opera Festival opened (February 4–20).

March
 26 Vossajazz started in Voss (April 26–28).
 27 Stein Urheim was awarded Vossajazzprisen 2010.
 27 Karin Krog and John Surman performs the commissioned work Songs about this and that for Vossajazz 2010.

April
 28 
 Bergenfest 2010 started in Bergen (April 28 – May 1).
 SoddJazz 2010 started in Inderøy, Nord-Trøndelag (April 28 – May 2).

May
 26
The start of Bergen International Music Festival Festspillene i Bergen 2010 (May 26 – June 7).
 Nattjazz 2010 started in Bergen (May 26 – June 5).
 29 – Eurovision Song Contest 2010 was held at Telenor Arena, Bærum. The two semi finals took place on 25 and 27 May. The 2010 winner was Germany.

June
 10 – Norwegian Wood 2010 started in Oslo, Norway (June 10 – 13).

July
 19 – Moldejazz started in Molde (July 19–24).

August
11 – Sildajazz starts in Haugesund (August 11–15).
 16 – Oslo Jazzfestival started (August 16 – 22).

September
 2 – Punktfestivalen started in Kristiansand (September 2–4).

October
 15
 The Ekkofestival started in Bergen (October 15 – 23).
 The Insomnia Festival started in Tromsø (October 15 – 24).

November
 2 – The Oslo World Music Festival started in Oslo (November 2 – 7).
 11 – The 5th Barents Jazz, Tromsø International Jazz Festival started (November 11 – 14).

December
 11 – The Nobel Peace Prize Concert was held at Telenor Arena.

Albums released

January
 11 – I.S. by Tore Johansen featuring Steve Swallow (Inner Ear).
 18 – Heavy Metal Fruit by Motorpsycho (Stickman Records, Rune Grammofon).

February

March
 1 – Just What the World Needs by Mads Eriksen (MTG Music).

April
 16 – Crime Scene by Terje Rypdal & Bergen Big Band (ECM Records).
 19 – Live Extracts by Eivind Aarset's Sonic Codex Orchestra (ECM Records).

May

June

July
 6 – Kvelertak by Kvelertak

August

September
 20 – Jan Garbarek and The Hilliard Ensemble: Officium Novum (ECM Records)

October
 19 – Norwegian Song 3 by Dag Arnesen (Losen Records)

November
 1 – Synlige Hjerteslag by Frida Ånnevik

December
 16 – License To Chill by keyboardist Haakon Graf with Per Mathisen and Erik Smith (Nordic Records).

Unknown date
#

A
 Atomic – Theater Tilters Vol 1.
 Atomic – Theater Tilters Vol 2.

E
 Eple Trio – In The Clearing / In The Cavern.

H
 Daniel Herskedal – City Stories.

New Artists
 Kvelertak received the Spellemannprisen award, as 'Best newcomer of the year 2010', for the album Kvelertak and was with that also recipient of the Gramo grant.
  Ferner/Juliusson was awarded the 2010 JazzIntro at the Moldejazz, Luly 21, 2010.

Deaths

January
 26 – Dag Frøland, comedian, singer and variety artist (born 1945).

 February
 10 – Kjell Solem, pop musician (born 1950)

March
 4 – Amalie Christie, classical pianist (born 1913).

April
 21 – Gustav Lorentzen, folk singer and entertainer in Knutsen & Ludvigsen, Cardiac arrest (born 1947).

May
 30 – Kristian Bergheim, jazz saxophonist (born 1926).

June
 5 – Arne Nordheim, contemporary classical experimental composer (born 1931).

July
 15 – Knut Stensholm, rock drummer, Sambandet (born 1954).
 23 – Willy Bakken, guitarist and popular culture writer (born 1951).

 September
 14 – Alf Kjellman, jazz saxophonist (born 1938).

October
 5 – Jack Berntsen, philologist, songwriter and folk singer (born 1940).

See also
 2010 in Norway
 Music of Norway
 Norway in the Eurovision Song Contest 2010

References

 
Norwegian music
Norwegian
Music
2010s in Norwegian music